The 2010 GP Miguel Induráin was the 57th edition of the GP Miguel Induráin cycle race and was held on 3 April 2010. The race started and finished in Estella. The race was won by Joaquim Rodríguez.

General classification

References

2010
2010 UCI Europe Tour
2010 in Spanish road cycling